Tainan Science Park of Taiwan is located in Sinshih, Shanhua and Anding Districts of Tainan City with a total area of , and is a part of the Southern Taiwan Science Park (STSP).

History
On 1 July 1993, the Executive Yuan approved the establishment of a science park in southern Taiwan as part of the Economic Revitalization Plan. The Phase I site of the park was approved in May 1995 and totaled , marking the beginning of high-tech development in southern Taiwan.  Phase II was approved in September 2001 and covered an area of  The park focuses on optoelectronics, integrated circuits, biotechnology, and precision machinery industries.

See also
Kaohsiung Science Park
Hsinchu Science Park

References

Further reading

1995 establishments in Taiwan
Buildings and structures in Tainan
Science parks in Taiwan